The Nanchang Uprising was the first major Nationalist Party of China–Chinese Communist Party engagement of the Chinese Civil War, begun by the Chinese Communists to counter the Shanghai massacre of 1927 by the Kuomintang.

The Kuomintang (KMT) left wing established a "Revolutionary Committee" at Nanchang to plant the spark that was expected to ignite a widespread peasant uprising. Deng Yanda, Song Qingling and Zhang Fakui (listed nominally, who later crushed the uprising) were among the political leaders.

Military forces in Nanchang under the leadership of He Long and Zhou Enlai rebelled in an attempt to seize control of the city after the end of the first Kuomintang-Communist alliance. Other important leaders in this event were Zhu De, Ye Ting, and Liu Bocheng.

Communist forces successfully occupied Nanchang and escaped from the siege of Kuomintang forces by 5 August, withdrawing to the Jinggang Mountains of western Jiangxi. 1 August was later regarded as the anniversary of the founding of the People's Liberation Army (PLA) and the first action fought against the Kuomintang and the National Revolutionary Army (NRA).

Names 
In Chinese, apart from the name shown above, the event is known as 1 August Nanchang Uprising, 1 August Uprising, Nanchang Rebellion, Nanchang Insurrection, or Nanchang Mutiny.

The Government of the People's Republic of China and the Chinese Communist Party refer this as the Nanchang Uprising, while the Government of the Republic of China and the Chinese Nationalist Party refer this as the Nanchang Rebellion or the August 1 Violence.

Order of battle

Communist forces 

Communist forces at their peak during the Nanchang Uprising totaled over 20,000, though some of them did not join the battle until a day later.  The entire Communist force was organized into the 2nd Front Army, and over half of it was under He Long's command.  He was also named Commander-in-Chief of the 2nd Front Army, and Ye Ting as deputy Commander-in-Chief and acting front-line Commander-in-Chief.  Communist representative was Zhou Enlai, chief of staff was Liu Bocheng and Director of the Political Directorate of the 2nd Front Army was Guo Moruo. The following is the order of battle for the Communist forces:
 9th Army commanded by Zhou Enlai, with Zhu De as the deputy commander and Zhu Kejing (朱克靖) as the Communist Party representative.
 11th Army commanded by Ye Ting, with Cai Tingkai as the deputy commander and Nie Rongzhen as the party representative.
 10th Division commanded by Cai Tingkai (蔡廷锴)
 24th Division commanded by Gu Xunming/Dong Zhongming (古勋铭/董仲明)
 25th Division commanded by Li Hanhun (李汉魂), and after taking Nanchang by Zhou Shidi (周士第)
 20th Army commanded by He Long and Liao Qianwu (廖乾吾) as the communist representative
 1st Division commanded by He Jinzhai (贺锦斋)
 2nd Division commanded by Qing Guangyuan (秦光远)
 3rd Division commanded by Zhou Yiqun (周逸群)

Battle at Nanchang 
The rebellion was initially planned to take place during the night of July 30, but due to complications with Zhang Guotao it was postponed until the next day. On the morning of 1 August 1927, at exactly 2:00 a.m., Zhou Enlai, He Long, Nie Rongzhen, Ye Ting, Ye Jianying, Lin Biao, Zhu De, Chen Yi and Liu Bocheng led their troops and attacked the city of Nanchang from different directions. Four hours later they took the city, capturing 5,000 small arms and around 1,000,000 rounds of ammunition.

Around noon the Revolutionary Committee of the Chinese Nationalist Party (中國國民黨革命委員會) was established (not to be confused with the Revolutionary Committee of the Kuomintang which was founded in 1948) to quell the insurgency. The committee has 25 members: Deng Yanda (邓演达), Zhang Fakui (张发奎), Tan Pingshan (谭平山), Chen Youren (陈友仁), Wu YuZhang (吴玉章), Peng Zemin (彭泽民), Lin Zuhan (林祖涵), He Long (贺龙), Guo Moruo (郭沫若), Huang Qixiang (黄琪翔), Yun Daiying (恽代英), Jiang Hao (江浩), Zhu Huiri (朱晖日), Zhou Enlai (周恩来), Zhang Guotao (张国焘), Ye Ting (叶挺), Zhang Shushi (张曙时), Li Lisan (李立三), Xu Teli (徐特立), Peng Pai (彭湃), Su Zhaozheng (苏兆征), Song Qingling (宋庆龄), He Xianning (何香凝), Yu Youren (于右任) and Jing Hengyi (经亨颐).

Retreat 
Facing a counterattack from the Nationalists, the Communists decided to retreat south towards the province of Guangdong.  Once there they would try to take over the city of Guangzhou while spreading their influence to the peasants and farms in that area.

Disaster Foretold 

Guangzhou was the target set by the Soviet Comintern and, on August 3, Communist troops pulled out of Nanchang. Their Little Long March came to an end at the beginning of October, as they came down out of the Hakka uplands and into the Chaoshan area. In Chaozhou they were defeated by Nationalist-affiliated troops. Communist forces were broken up and traveled in two general directions, one heading to Shanwei where they engaged the Nationalists in guerrilla warfare under Peng Pai, and the other to southern Hunan, where they eventually joined a force under Mao Zedong, whose abortive Autumn Harvest Uprising had been no more successful.

The Communist forces had suffered such a decisive and disastrous defeat that only 1,000 soldiers remained as a complete unit, reforming into a regiment. Under the command of Zhu De and Chen Yi, who had faked their names, the regiment went to a local Hunan warlord and sought refuge. From this humble beginning the force eventually grew to 10,000 strong, traveling to Jiangxi and joining Mao Zedong at Jinggangshan in April 1928.

Liu Bocheng became a fugitive but was lucky enough to find other Communists who helped him and eventually sent him to the Soviet Union for military training, while Lin Biao deserted after the defeat. However, he had to return to the Communist force because of his fear that locals hostile to his side would turn him over to his enemies or kill him. Guo Moruo fled to Japan after the defeat.

Other surviving members were much less fortunate; all became fugitives. Zhou Enlai, Ye Jianying and Ye Ting lost contact with the others and fled to British Hong Kong, with Zhou seriously ill. The three had two pistols with them and were successful in reaching Hong Kong. Nie Rongzhen, the other communist leader, also successfully escaped to Hong Kong.

He Long 
He Long had strongly opposed the retreat plan, accurately pointing out that marching 1000 miles in the heat of summer would put a severe strain on the troops, and that popular support for the Communists in Guangdong was merely a fraction of the huge support they had among the peasantry in Hunan. His opinion was that the new Communist base should be established in the border region of Hunan, suggesting that in Hunan the Communist troops would be easily resupplied and their numbers increased by the enlistment of the local populace. However, his suggestion was vetoed.

He Long went home alone after the defeat. Demoted from his position as an army commander in charge of tens of thousands of men to that of a beggar, he was not well received by his family except for a few who were already Communists. He would soon raise another force of Communist soldiers, this time more than 3000 strong, but it would be wiped out by the Nationalists, with less than three dozen members surviving. It would take a year for He Long's force to recover for the third time.

See also 
 History of the People's Liberation Army

References

Citations

Sources 

 Jung Chang and Jon Halliday, Mao: The Unknown Story (London, 2005); Jonathan Cape, .
 Nanchang Mutiny http://www.republicanchina.org/NanchangMutiny-v0.pdf

External links 
 https://web.archive.org/web/20040611014112/http://81.china1840-1949.net.cn/qyjj.htm 
 https://web.archive.org/web/20030810044407/http://news.xinhuanet.com/ziliao/2003-07/28/content_996380.htm 

Conflicts in 1927
1927 protests
August 1927 events
Military operations of the Chinese Civil War
1927 in China
National Revolutionary Army
Military history of Jiangxi